Dangu is a commune on the river Epte in the Eure department in the Normandy region in northern France.

It is home to the renowned Haras de Dangu, once a large estate and thoroughbred horse breeding and training farm owned by Count Frédéric de Lagrange (1815–1883).

Population

See also
Communes of the Eure department

References

Communes of Eure